Luís Roberto Barroso (born 11 March 1958) is a Brazilian law professor, jurist, Justice of the Supreme Federal Court of Brazil, having been nominated to the position by President Dilma Rousseff in 2013, and, since 25 May 2020, Barroso has also served as President of the Superior Electoral Court.

Barroso graduated in law from the Universidade do Estado do Rio de Janeiro (UERJ), has a Master's Degree in law by Yale University, and a PhD from UERJ, being a Professor of Constitutional Law in the university, while also doing post-doctoral studies in the Harvard Law School.

He is considered a liberal and progressive Justice, making landmark votes on the legalization of abortion in pregnancies originated from rape and the criminalization of homophobia and transphobia in Brazil.

Life and career
Born in the city of Vassouras, Barroso received a bachelor's degree in law from the State University of Rio de Janeiro (UERJ) in 1980, and an LL.M. from Yale Law School in 1987. He received a doctorate in public law from UERJ in 2008 and is a tenured professor of constitutional law at the university. In 2011, Barroso was a visiting scholar at Harvard Law School, and while in the United States published the paper "Here, there and everywhere: human dignity in contemporary law and in the transnational discourse".

At 2011, Barroso became nationally known for being the lawyer of the terrorist Cesare Battisti in Brazil, with whom he shares the same ideology. According to Barroso defense, all actions of Battisti were justified because Battisti was fighting an authoritarian italian regime when he committed the murders, at the 70's.

Barroso owned the law firm Luís Roberto Barroso & Associados in Rio de Janeiro, which specialized in public law and Supreme Court litigation. Prior to being nominated to the Supreme Federal Court by Dilma Rousseff in May 2013 to replace Justice Carlos Ayres Britto, Barroso served as a state attorney in Rio de Janeiro state. He was the fourth Supreme Court nominee of Rousseff, who had previously nominated the justices Luiz Fux, Rosa Weber and Teori Zavascki. He was confirmed by the Federal Senate in early June, and was sworn into office on 26 June 2013.

Barroso has been invited to lecture in various universities around the world, including the prestigious New York University School of Law, in the United States, and London School of Economics and Oxford University, in England.

Barroso is an advocate for drug legalization, starting with decriminalising the possession of marijuana for private consumption. His judicial views have been described as progressive.

References

|-

|-

|-

1958 births
Living people
Supreme Federal Court of Brazil justices
Yale Law School alumni
People from Vassouras
Rio de Janeiro State University alumni
Brazilian Jews
Brazilian people of Greek-Jewish descent